William Bird (born 17 April 1795) was an English first-class cricketer associated with Cambridge Town Club who was active in the 1820s. He is recorded in two matches from 1821 to 1822, totalling 13 runs with a highest score of 8.

References

English cricketers
English cricketers of 1787 to 1825
Cambridge Town Club cricketers
1795 births
Year of death unknown